Mark N. Dion (born 1955) is an American politician, law enforcement officer and lawyer from Maine, currently serving on the Portland City Council. Dion, a Democrat, was elected Sheriff of Cumberland County, Maine in 1998. Re-elected in 2002 and 2006, Dion chose not to seek re-election as Sheriff in 2010. Instead, he successfully sought a seat in the Maine House of Representatives. In 2013, Dion was named Chair of the Criminal Justice and Public Safety Committee.

Dion ran for Governor of Maine in 2018, placing fifth in the Democratic Party primary. In 2020, he won a seat on the Portland City Council after a four-way race where he won 39% of the vote.

Education
Dion earned a B.A. in criminal justice at the University of Southern Maine, a M.A. in human services administration from Antioch College and a J.D. from the University of Maine School of Law.

References

1955 births
Living people
University of Southern Maine alumni
Antioch College alumni
University of Maine School of Law alumni
Maine sheriffs
Maine lawyers
Politicians from Portland, Maine
Democratic Party members of the Maine House of Representatives
21st-century American politicians